Alta-Talvik (or the historic: Alten-Talvig) is a former municipality in Finnmark county, Norway.  The  municipality existed from 1838 until its dissolution in 1863.  It was located along the Altafjorden and the river Altaelva with the same borders as the present-day Alta Municipality.  The administrative centre was the village of Alta (in 2000, the village was declared a town).  The European route E6 highway runs through the area today.

History
The parish of Alten-Talvig was established as a municipality on 1 January 1838 (see formannskapsdistrikt). According to the 1835 census, the area had a population of 3,085.  In 1863, the municipality of Alten-Talvig was dissolved and its area was split to create two new municipalities: Alten (population: 2,442) in the south and Talvig (population: 1,938) in the north.  The two municipalities lasted for 101 years independently.  During the 1960s, there were many municipal mergers across Norway due to the work of the Schei Committee. On 1 January 1964, Talvik and Alta were merged back together to form the present-day Alta Municipality.

See also
List of former municipalities of Norway

References

External links

Alta, Norway
Former municipalities of Norway
1838 establishments in Norway
1863 disestablishments in Norway